The Promise is a 1917 American silent drama film directed by Jay Hunt and starring Harold Lockwood, May Allison and Lester Cuneo.

Cast
 Harold Lockwood as Bill Carmody 
 May Allison as Ethel Manton 
 Lester Cuneo as Buck Moncrossen 
 Paul Willis as Charlie Manton 
 Lillian Hayward as Mrs. Appleton 
 W.H. Bainbridge as D.S. Appleton 
 George Fisher as St. Ledger 
 Leota Lorraine as Miss Baker 
 John Steppling as Fallon 
 Gibson Gowland as Stromberg

References

Bibliography
 Robert B. Connelly. The Silents: Silent Feature Films, 1910-36, Volume 40, Issue 2. December Press, 1998.

External links
 

1917 films
1917 drama films
1910s English-language films
American silent feature films
Silent American drama films
American black-and-white films
Films directed by Jay Hunt
Metro Pictures films
1910s American films